KFAT (92.9 FM, "K-Fat") is a Rhythmic CHR-formatted radio station in Anchorage, Alaska, United States. The station is currently owned by Ohana Media Group.  Its studios are located in Downtown Anchorage and its transmitter is in Eagle River, Alaska.
 

Home to "Alaska's Hottest Hits", KFAT is one of the highest-rated radio stations in Alaska.

The station was assigned the call letters KWQJ on October 3, 1990. On February 7, 1997, the station changed its call sign to the current KFAT.

References

External links
Ohana Media Group Anchorage Stations

1999 establishments in Alaska
Ohana Broadcast Company, LLC stations
Radio stations established in 1999
FAT
Rhythmic contemporary radio stations in the United States